The 2015–16 U.S. Virgin Islands Championship was a four-team tournament that determined the domestic champion of the U.S. Virgin Islands.

Regular season

St. Croix Soccer League 

As of May 7, 2016
Source:

St. Thomas Soccer League 

No points were announced, just the final standings:

Raymix (champions)
Haitian Victory (qualified)
UWS
New Vibes
Waitikubuli
Togetherness
Laraza

Tournament

Bracket

Results

Semifinals

Consolation match

Final

References 

U.S. Virgin Islands Championship seasons
United States Virgin Islands
football
football